This is a list of guidebook writers for the hill-walking areas of the UK.

Alfred Wainwright produced a comprehensive set of hand-drawn guides to the Lake District and Pennine Way
Bill Birkett
Cameron McNeish - Scottish guidebook writer
George & Ashley Abraham, were climber/photographers who, together with Owen Glynne Jones, started the tradition of photographic guides, though concentrating mainly on rock-climbing
Hamish Brown
M. J. B. Baddeley wrote guidebooks in the early 1900s (after the style of Baedeker?) His Lake District  volume continued in revised editions into the late 1960s
W. A. Poucher developed the photographic guide to upland areas in the early 1960s
Walt Unsworth co-founder of Cicerone Press

The Scottish Mountaineering Club produces a set of 8 District Guides covering both the Scottish Highlands,  Skye & Islands, and the hills of lowlands

 
Walking in the United Kingdom
Hill-walking
Hillwalking
UK